Vishtèn is a Canadian folk music group from Prince Edward Island and the Magdalen Islands, whose style is rooted in Acadian music. The group consisted of vocalists and instrumentalists Pastelle and Emmanuelle LeBlanc, and instrumentalist Pascal Miousse, but Pastelle LeBlanc died of breast cancer in 2022 at age 42. The group is most noted for their 2018 album Horizons, which received a Juno Award nomination for Traditional Roots Album of the Year at the Juno Awards of 2019. The band includes instruments such as fiddle, electric guitar, accordion, mandolin, whistles, jaw harp, foot percussion and bodhran.

Horizons also won several awards from Music PEI, including best francophone artist, group recording and roots traditional recording. In 2018 they also collaborated with Joseph Edgar, Robin-Joël Cool, Wanabi Farmeur, Caroline Savoie, and Édith Butler on the album Grand tintamarre ! - Chansons et comptines acadiennes, which won the Canadian Folk Music Award for Best Children's Album at the 14th Canadian Folk Music Awards.

Discography 
Vishten (2004)
11:11 (2007)
Live (2008)
Mōsaïk (2012)
Terre rouge (2015)
Horizons (2018)

Awards and Honours
 East Coast Music Awards (ECMA)
 2019 Recording of the year - Folklore/traditional for Horizons 
 2016 Roots/Recording of a traditional group of the year for Terre Rouge 
 2013 Francophone album of the year for Mosaïk 
 2006 Francophone album of the year for 11:11
 2002 Media’s’ choice
 Music PEI
 2019  Francophone Artist of the year
 2019 Traditional recording of the year for Horizon 
 2016 Francophone Artist of the year
 2008 Francophone artist of the year
 2008 Album of the year 
 2008 traditional group of the year
 La Société professionnelle des auteurs et des compositeurs du Québec (SPACQ)/ The Professional Society of Authors and Composers of Québec
 2015 Édith Butler Prize – Canadian francophonie

References

External links

 
 

Canadian folk music groups
Musical groups from Prince Edward Island